Wenxin Forest Park is a metro station on the Green Line operated by Taichung Metro in Nantun District, Taichung, Taiwan.

The station name is taken from Wenxin Forest Park, a park that houses Fulfillment Amphitheater, which is located nearby.

Station layout

References 

Taichung Metro
Railway stations in Taichung
Railway stations opened in 2020